Motiva Ltd is a Finnish state company, which promotes the efficient and sustainable use of energy and materials. Its customers include both the public and private sectors. The Motiva Group also includes Motiva Services Ltd which provides companies and corporations with energy efficiency consultancy services and manages the Nordic swan and EU Ecolabel in Finland.

Motiva's operations started in 1993 as a service center for energy conservation. In the 1998 a new task was added: the promotion of renewable energy. Motiva was reformed into a state-owned joint stock company in November 2000.

Motiva Ltd and Motiva Services Ltd had a combined staff of approximately 60 in May 2017 and net sales of approximately EUR 8.16 million in 2015.

References 
 Motiva: Motiva – a Sustainable Development Company. Motiva Website, accessed 21.12.2018.

Government-owned companies of Finland
Energy consultancies